Alfa Romeo 33 may refer to:

 Alfa Romeo T33, a sports car racing prototype used from 1968 to 1977
 Alfa Romeo 33 Stradale, a rare road going version of the race car, built in 1967
 Alfa Romeo 33 Series, a compact car produced between 1983 and 1994